Olga Igorevna Zaytseva (born November 10, 1984) is a Russian sprint athlete.

Zaytseva won the bronze medal in the 400 m at the 2006 European Athletics Championships in Gothenburg, as well as a gold medal in the 4 × 400 m relay.

She was also part of the 4 × 400 m relay team for Russia that set the world record for the indoor event in 2006.

See also
List of European Athletics Championships medalists (women)

References

 

1984 births
Living people
Sportspeople from Kaliningrad Oblast
Russian female sprinters
Russian long jumpers
European Athletics Championships winners
European Athletics Championships medalists
Russian Athletics Championships winners
World Athletics indoor record holders (relay)